The Idol of Bonanza Camp is a 1913 American silent short comedy film starring Harry Van Meter, Alexander Gaden and Edna Maison.

External links

1913 films
1913 comedy films
1913 short films
Silent American comedy films
American silent short films
American black-and-white films
American comedy short films
1910s American films